San Pietro Val Lemina (French: Saint-Pierre) is a town and comune in the Metropolitan City of Turin, part of the Piedmont region, northern Italy. It takes its name from the Lemina torrent, which flows in its territory.

External links 
 
 Information at communi-italiani.it 

Cities and towns in Piedmont